Wednesbury Central railway station was a station on the Great Western Railway's London Paddington to Birkenhead via Birmingham Snow Hill line. It was opened as Wednesbury in 1854 and was one of two stations serving Wednesbury in the West Midlands. It was renamed to Wednesbury Central in 1950 following nationalisation. It closed along with the Birmingham to Wolverhampton section of the line in 1972.

Site Today
The site is now used by the Midland Metro as  Wednesbury Great Western Street tram stop.

References

Disused railway stations in Sandwell
Former Great Western Railway stations
Railway stations in Great Britain opened in 1854
Railway stations in Great Britain closed in 1972
Wednesbury